Henry Clay Bulis (November 14, 1830 – September 7, 1897) was an American politician and physician.

Born in Clinton County, New York, Bulis studied medicine. He moved to Decorah, Iowa, where he practiced medicine. Bulis was an Indian agent. He also served as mayor of Decorah and was postmaster. Between 1866 and 1871, he held an Iowa Senate seat, representing District 42 as a Republican. He resigned from the state senate and served as Lieutenant Governor of Iowa until 1874. He died in Decorah.

Notes

1830 births
1897 deaths
People from Clinton County, New York
People from Decorah, Iowa
Mayors of places in Iowa
Iowa state senators
Lieutenant Governors of Iowa
Iowa postmasters
Physicians from Iowa
19th-century American politicians